According to legend, Pythagoras discovered the foundations of musical tuning by listening to the sounds of four blacksmith's hammers, which produced consonance and dissonance when they were struck simultaneously. According to Nicomachus in his 2nd century CE Enchiridion harmonices  Pythagoras noticed that hammer A produced consonance with hammer B when they were struck together, and hammer C produced consonance with hammer A, but hammers B and C produced dissonance with each other. Hammer D produced such perfect consonance with hammer A that they seemed to be "singing" the same note. Pythagoras rushed into the blacksmith shop to discover why, and found that the explanation was in the weight ratios. The hammers weighed 12, 9, 8, and 6 pounds respectively. Hammers A and D were in a ratio of 2:1, which is the ratio of the octave. Hammers B and C weighed 8 and 9 pounds. Their ratios with hammer D were (12:8 = 3:2 = perfect fifth) and (12:9 = 4:3 = perfect fourth). The space between B and C is a ratio of 9:8, which is equal to the musical whole tone, or whole step interval.

The legend is, at least with respect to the hammers, demonstrably false. It is probably a Middle Eastern folk tale. These proportions are indeed relevant to string length (e.g. that of a monochord) — using these founding intervals, it is possible to construct the chromatic scale and the basic seven-tone diatonic scale used in modern music, and Pythagoras might well have been influential in the discovery of these proportions  (hence, sometimes referred to as Pythagorean tuning) — but the proportions do not have the same relationship to hammer weight and the tones produced by them. However, hammer-driven chisels with equal cross-section, show an exact proportion between length or weight and Eigenfrequency.

Earlier sources mention Pythagoras' interest in harmony and ratio. Xenocrates (4th century BCE), while not as far as we know mentioning the blacksmith story, described Pythagoras' interest in general terms: "Pythagoras discovered also that the intervals in music do not come into being apart from number; for they are an interrelation of quantity with quantity. So he set out to investigate under what conditions concordant intervals come about, and discordant ones, and everything well-attuned and ill-tuned." Whatever the details of the discovery of the relationship between music and ratio, it is regarded  as historically the first empirically secure mathematical description of a physical fact. As such, it is symbolic of, and perhaps leads to, the Pythagorean conception of mathematics as nature's modus operandi.  As Aristotle was later to write, "the Pythagoreans construct the whole universe out of numbers".

See also 
 Just intonation

External links

References 

Acoustics
Ancient Greek science
Pythagorean philosophy
Musical tuning